Christopher Black Cannon (born October 20, 1950) is an American politician who formerly served as a member of the United States House of Representatives, for the Republican Party, representing the third district of Utah from 1997 to 2009.

He was born in Salt Lake City, Utah and attended Brigham Young University (BYU) as well as J. Reuben Clark Law School of BYU. From 1980 until 1996 he was a lawyer, business owner, and venture capitalist, from which he became a millionaire. Other jobs include time as an associate solicitor for the United States Department of the Interior from 1984 to 1986, and time as Utah Republican Party finance chairman from 1992 until 1994.  On June 24, 2008, he was defeated in the 2008 Republican Party third district primary by Jason Chaffetz, former chief of staff to then-Utah Governor Jon Huntsman Jr.

Family 

Chris Cannon is part of the well-known Cannon Family of Utah. His brother, Joe Cannon is the former GOP State Party Chairman, and was appointed as Editor in Chief of the Deseret Morning News in November 2006. He is the third member of his family to serve in the House, but the first voting member.  His great-grandfather, George Q. Cannon, was a nonvoting member of the House from 1873 to 1881, while Utah was still a territory, whose son Frank Cannon was the state's first senator, as well as a non voting delegate.

Congressional career 
In 1996, Cannon was the Republican candidate in Utah's 3rd District against Democratic incumbent Bill Orton, who had managed to hold the seat for three terms (all by fairly large margins) despite its heavy Republican tilt.  This time, however, the district's partisan lean proved too much for Orton to overcome, and Cannon defeated him by four points.  He never faced another general election contest nearly that close, and was reelected five times.

Cannon first entered the national spotlight in 1999, when as a member of the House Judiciary Subcommittee on Commercial and Administrative Law, he was one of 13 House managers who prosecuted the case against President Bill Clinton in the impeachment trial in the U. S. Senate.

Cannon was named Chairman of the Commercial and Administrative Law Subcommittee at the beginning of the 108th Congress in January 2003, and has served as its ranking Republican from 2007 – 2009.   He also served on the Judiciary Subcommittee on Courts, the Internet, and Intellectual Property.

Cannon was also a member of the House Government Reform Committee. He served on the Subcommittees on Criminal Justice, Drug Policy and Human Resources as well as Regulatory Affairs. Cannon was also a member of the House Resources Committee, serving on the Energy and Mineral Resources and Forests and Forest Health Subcommittees.

In 2000, Cannon co-founded the Congressional Caucus to Fight and Control Methamphetamine, which has nearly 130 members from both major political parties in 2008.

In January 2001, Cannon hired David Safavian as his chief of staff. Safavian left on May 16, 2002, to take a position at the General Services Administration. Safavian was arrested in September 2005 in connection with the Jack Abramoff corruption case, and was convicted in June 2006 on four felony counts.

In January 2003, Cannon was elected chairman of the influential Western Caucus, an organization of over 50 Congressmen working on resource management issues.

He was a cosponsor of HR 2043, legislation that would provide voting representation for the District of Columbia. The bill also gives another Congressional seat to Utah.

Campaigns and challengers 
Cannon was one of the most conservative members of the House.  He has a lifetime rating of 96 from the American Conservative Union.  This is not surprising, as he represented one of the most Republican districts in the nation.  President Bush received 77% of the vote in the district in 2004, his second highest percentage for a congressional district not located in Texas.  However, during his last three reelection bids, he faced primary challengers running well to his right.

2004 
In 2004, Cannon defeated Republican challenger Matt Throckmorton in the primary, getting 58.4% of the vote, in a race in which the major issue dividing the candidates was immigration policy. He then beat Democratic opponent Beau Babka 63%–33% in the November race. Cannon spent more than $600,000 to defeat Throckmorton and Babka. Throckmorton raised $84,000; Babka spent $35,000. The spending imbalance was offset to some extent by immigration reform groups that attacked Cannon through billboards, ads and Web sites, though these did not support his Democratic opponent.

2006

Primary
Cannon faced opposition in the primaries from a fellow Republican for the first five times he ran (and won), but his opposition in 2006 seemed potentially stronger. In October 2005, millionaire real estate developer John D. Jacob announced that he would run against Cannon in 2006. In May 2006, at the state GOP convention, Jacob surprised Cannon by winning 52 percent of the delegate ballots to Cannon's 48 percent—a shocking result for a five-term incumbent.  Had Jacob won 60 percent of the delegate ballots, he would have won the nomination outright and ended Cannon's career. Team America PAC, a PAC dedicated to strict immigration enforcement, spent $50,000 on a radio advertising campaign attacking Cannon for his views on immigration ("A vote for John Jacob is a vote for cleaning up the immigration mess Chris Cannon helped make.")

The Republican primary was held on June 27, 2006. Polls predicted a close race.  However, Cannon received 32,306 votes (55.8%) and Jacob received 25,589 votes (44.2%).

General election
Cannon faced Democrat Christian Burridge, a consumer rights attorney and also a graduate of Brigham Young University's Law School, in November, as well as Jim Noorlander (Constitution Party) and Phil Hallman (Libertarian party). In the general election, Cannon received 92,621 votes (58%), Burridge 51,396 (32%), Noorlander 14,116 (9%) and Hallman 1,998 votes (1%).  Cannon's 58 percent was somewhat closer than expected, given the heavy Republican tilt of his district.

2008 
In 2008, Cannon faced two primary opponents—Jason Chaffetz, a businessman and chief of staff to Governor Jon Huntsman, Jr. and David O. Leavitt, brother of former governor Mike Leavitt.  On the first ballot at the state convention, Chaffetz received 59.01% of the delegate vote to Cannon's 40.9%. Chaffetz fell a few hundred votes short of clinching the nomination outright. Leavitt was eliminated, and immediately endorsed Cannon.  Young Leavitt supporters then walked into the convention hall with newly toted signs in support of Cannon, which The Salt Lake Tribune termed "likely a violation of the convention rules."  The rule supposedly referred to is "Physical Arrangements – 3(d)" which states "No signs may be placed in or around the staging area of the arena or in the convention hall between bleachers in the main Assembly Hall, except as approved by the State Party," which prohibits the placement of signs in the convention hall, but not the carrying nor holding of signs.  The supporters were asked to leave the hall by the state vice chairman and exited when called upon to do so.

In the June 24 runoff primary, Chaffetz beat Cannon by nearly 9,000 votes, 60%–40%, ending Cannon's congressional career.  Immigration policy was again a significant issue.  Cannon refused to meet with Chaffetz after the election to discuss the Transition.

Controversies

Premium Beef of Nebraska
Cannon's financial disclosure statements show that he gave a loan of between $50,000 to $100,000 to Gary Ruse, an executive and later president of First National Bank of Nebraska, in September 1996. The following year, the bank made a loan of $250,000 to the Premium Beef of Nebraska company, a kosher beef packing plant in which Cannon was a major investor. Ruse said in an interview he played no part in getting Cannon the loan. It was a decision, he said, that was made by the bank's board of directors; he had recused himself.

The Premium Beef plant operated for a little more than a year before closing its doors, after the rabbi who oversaw the preparation of the meat died. Cannon's chief of staff, Joe Hunter, said that the assets of the business were liquidated and Cannon repaid the loan to the Nebraska bank in 2001. The plant was sold to a Hasidic Jewish sect that took several years but finally reopened it in 2005. Ruse, who left the bank, was hired as manager for the reopened plant.

Cannon's personal loan to Ruse remains outstanding. Cannon spokesman Charles Isom said that Ruse made a payment on the loan in late 1996 and then payments on the interest in 2000 and 2001. According to Cannon's financial disclosure forms, Cannon collected between $200 and $1,000 in interest on Ruse's loan in 2000 and 2001. He did not collect interest in 2002 or 2003 and has not otherwise received interest payments.

Cannon's office stressed that the congressman has made repeated efforts to collect the loan. Cannon's most recent financial disclosure forms show the amount outstanding is still over $50,000.

Lobbying by brother Joe Cannon
Chris Cannon's brother, Joseph Cannon, was chairman of the Utah Republican Party, a former business partner of his brother, and led a team of 10 lobbyists at Pillsbury Winthrop Shaw Pittman, a law and lobbying firm. From late 2006 to 2010, he served as editor of Utah's second-largest daily newspaper, Deseret Morning News (now Deseret News).

Cannon acknowledged helping his brother's clients, pointing out that he had been active on the issue in the past before being approached by his brother. "If my wife decided to lobby, then we would probably say, 'No talking to my office.' I just don't see my brother in the same category," Cannon said.

Cannon has a financial interest in his brother's success: The lobbyist owes him more than $250,000, according to the lawmaker's financial disclosure reports. The debt stems from Joseph Cannon's unsuccessful campaign for the U. S. Senate in 1992. Citizens for Responsibility and Ethics in Washington, a nonpartisan advocacy organization, named Chris Cannon a "member to watch" on its list of "most corrupt" members of Congress for his dealings with his brother.

Obama autobiography

Cannon offered Hertford College, Oxford philosopher Peter Millican $10,000 to prove that then-presidential candidate Barack Obama's memoir Dreams from My Father was ghostwritten by Bill Ayers by using computer analysis to compare that work to Ayers' Fugitive Days.  During the 2008 US Presidential election, conservatives attempted to link Obama to Ayers, a former radical leader of the Weather Underground.  Regarding the claim that Ayers authored Obama's book, Millican concluded "I feel totally confident that it is false".

Electoral history

*Write-in and minor candidate notes:  In 1992, Nels J'Anthony received 384 votes.  In 1996, John Phillip Langford received 270 votes.  In 1998, write-ins received 20 votes.  In 2000, Natural Law candidate Randall Tolpinrud received 852 votes.  In 2002, John William Maurin received 1 vote.  In 2004, Curtis Darrell James received 2,390 votes.

References

External links
 
 
 Beyond Abramoff: Gambling lobbyist joined with anti-gambling congressman, derailed gambling bills John Byrne, Raw Story, September 1, 2005

1950 births
1996 United States presidential electors
20th-century American politicians
21st-century American politicians
American people of Manx descent
Businesspeople from Salt Lake City
Cannon family
J. Reuben Clark Law School alumni
Latter Day Saints from Utah
Lawyers from Salt Lake City
Living people
People from Mapleton, Utah
Republican Party members of the United States House of Representatives from Utah
United States Department of the Interior officials